Pagoda festivals (paya pwe) are regular festivals found throughout Burma (Myanmar) that commemorate major religious events in pagoda's history, including the founding of a pagoda and the crowning of the pagoda's hti (umbrella). Pagoda festivals are dictated by the Burmese religious calendar and often are held several days at a time. Major events in a pagoda festival typically do not coincide with Uposatha (Buddhist Sabbath) days, during which pious Buddhists observe the Eight Precepts. The majority of pagoda festivals are held during the dry season, from the months of Tazaungmon (November) to Tabaung (March). During the full moon day of Tabaung (Magha Puja), Buddhist devotees in various parts of Myanmar also celebrate sand pagoda festivals.

More well-known pagoda festivals often attract numerous pilgrims from throughout the country.

Pagoda festivals are similar in nature to agricultural shows (country fairs) or carnivals, and form a significant important part of cultural life, particularly in the countryside. During pagoda festivals, temporary bazaars (including food stalls and merchandise stands), entertainment venues (including anyeint dramas, yoke the performances, lethwei matches, and arcades) are set up in the vicinity of the pagoda.

Major pagoda festivals
Shwe Settaw Pagoda Festival (Minbu Township, Magwe Region) - Tabodwe to Tabaung
Ananda Temple Festival (Bagan, Mandalay Region) - Pyatho
Shwezigon Pagoda Festival (Bagan, Mandalay Region) - 
Kyaikhtiyo Pagoda Festival (Kyaikhto, Mon State) - Nadaw
Shwedagon Pagoda Festival (Yangon, Yangon Region) - Tabaung
Alaungdaw Kathapa Pagoda Festival (Sagaing Region) - Tabodwe
Shwe Sayan Pagoda Festival (Thaton, Mon State) - 
Shwesayan Pagoda Festival (Patheingyi Township, Mandalay Region) - Tabaung
Myathalun Pagoda Festival (Magwe Region) - Thadingyut
Shite-thaung Temple Festival (Mrauk U, Rakhine State) - 
Hpaung Daw U Pagoda Festival (Shan State) - Thadingyut
Kyaikkhauk Pagoda Festival (Thanlyin Township, Yangon Region) - Tabodwe
Shwesandaw Pagoda Festival (Twante Township, Yangon Region) - Tagu
Botahtaung Pagoda Festival (Yangon) - Nadaw
Mawtinzun Pagoda Festival (Ngapudaw Township, Ayeyarwady Region) - Tabaung
Shwemawdaw Pagoda Festival (Bago) - Tagu

See also
Buddhism in Burma
Burmese calendar
Burmese pagoda
Sand pagoda
Thadingyut Festival
Vessantara Festival

References

Buddhist festivals
Festivals in Myanmar